Lindsay Sharman is a British writer, comedian and actress.

Career
Sharman began her comedy career in 2009. After reaching the finals of the 2010 Funny Women awards, she took two shows to the 2011 Edinburgh Festival Fringe - Giants Of Comedy and A Time Traveller's Guide to Surviving Childhood  as part of PBH's Free Fringe. At Edinburgh 2012, she performed in George Ryegold's God-In-A-Bag  at the Underbelly Bristo Square.

She performs in character as Madame Magenta and as The Poet, and took her first solo show Madame Magenta: Libros Mystica to Edinburgh in 2014.

Since then, she has co-written four Edinburgh Festival Fringe productions with her husband and collaborator Laurence Owen: Cinemusical (2015), Cinemusical High (2016), The Time Machine (2017), which subsequently toured the UK, and Jekyll vs Hyde (2019).

In 2020, Lindsay co-founded Long Cat Media, a podcast production company specialising in audio fiction. Her first podcast series, Mockery Manor, was nominated for Best Fiction at the British Podcast Awards 2020.

Awards 

 British Podcast Awards 2020  Nominated: Best Fiction (for Mockery Manor)
 Hackney Empire New Act of the Year 2013  - Finalist
 Piccadilly Comedy Club New Comedian Of 2013  - Finalist
 Funny Women Award 2010  - Finalist
 Mirth Bath New Act of the Year 2010 - Finalist

References 

Year of birth missing (living people)
Living people
British comedians
British actresses